The 'Shri Ram School ' is a co-educational private school in India. It is one of the most sought-after schools in the country. Founded in July 1988, the Shri Ram School has four campuses spread across the National Capital Region of India. The first is the Junior School in Vasant Vihar, New Delhi to which was added the Senior School on Moulsari Avenue, DLF Phase III, Gurgaon in 1994.

The Shri Ram School - Aravali was established in 2000 at the request of DLF Limited. It is a common campus for Pravesh Vatika (Nursery), Upvan (Kindergarten) through to Class XII. It is situated at the Hamilton Court Complex, DLF Phase IV, Gurgaon. In 2009, a new branch, "The Shriram Millennium School" was opened in Noida. The Noida School is located in Sector-135.

All the campuses follow a common curriculum, but the Moulsari campus follows the IB, IGCSE, and ICSE. It has been rated the best ICSE and ISC school for five years in a row from 2012 to 2017. The Special Education Needs Department was started in April 1997 to provide educational opportunities to children with special needs in smaller settings. Children aged four to ten years attend the Junior School at Vasant Vihar/Aravali and as they turn eleven years they move on to Senior School at Moulsari/Aravali respectively.

Overview 
Founded by Mrs. Manju Bharat Ram in July 1988 under the aegis of SRF Ltd. and now the SRF Foundation, TSRS began with the pre-primary section, and a Form was added every year.

Students are selected based on their academic and intellectual capabilities. It is known for a high rate of rejection and low rate of acceptance of about 4%. 

It is one of the most financially expensive Indian board schools in India and one of the only few schools that offer the IB curriculum along with an Indian board curriculum in India.

Houses and Student Council 
The school has four houses- 
Vasundhara (the earth - red)
Sagar (the ocean-blue) 
Himgiri (mountains - yellow) 
Srishti (creation - green)

Student Council

The Student Council consists of the Senior Council (Grade XII) and the Junior Council (Grade XI). The Senior Council consists of a Head Boy, a Head Girl, a Head of Events, two Heads of sports (one boy and one girl), a Head of Social Initiatives, a Head of Information, Communication, and Technology, and a Head of Environment. Each house has a Captain from the Senior Council along with Vice Captains from the Junior Council. The Student Council is elected by the student body of the school. There is also an Editorial Board, dealing with matters such as the school magazine, yearbook, event coverage, literary festivals, and newsletters. This consists of two Chief Editors, one Managing Editor, and other editors.

Motto 
Vidya Dadaati Vinayam - May Education Foster Humility.
The national anthem is also widely sung at Shri Ram
Awards.
The Shri Ram School was rated the best school in India in 2010 by the magazine "Education World"; in 2011 it came in second.

Curriculum 

The school ascribes to the ISC and ICSE Boards. In addition, the IB Diploma Programme (since January 2005), administered by the International Baccalaureate (IB)  and the National Indian Open Schooling Certificate are offered at the Senior School in the Moulsari campus.

Campus facilities/infrastructure 
The Junior School is at the edge of the Ridge Forest on a  plot.

The school has a science laboratory, computer and ICT labs, music and dance rooms, lunch room, assembly hall sports facilities, yoga room and all-weather performance area, Shri Manch.

Facilities include a library, computer laboratories, science laboratories, AV room, workshop room, liberal arts studio, auditorium, gymnasium, medical room, SEN/NIOS rooms, kitchens, lunch area and staff rooms.

The Shri Ram School - Aravali is on the Hamilton Court complex in DLF City, Phase IV, Gurgaon. Its campus is equipped with basketball courts in the Manju Bharat ram hall and football ground.

The building has two wings - the Junior and Senior, containing the library, science laboratories, Computer Laboratories, workshop room/AV room, SEN/NIOS rooms, art and craft rooms, music and dance studios, and the lunch hall. A new wing for the Elementary School is under construction, designed for low consumption of energy - the rooms will not need to be lit during the days, and they will be well-ventilated and naturally insulated against the heat and cold, with solar panels on the roof and rooftop rainwater harvesting.

There is a plan to add another building to the DLF campus. An extra floor is also being added to the older school buildings of the DLF campus. An extra floor has already been added to The Shri Ram School - Aravali and an auditorium has been constructed.

2010 molestation incident 
In 2010, a child was allegedly molested by a contract employee at school. Upon being asked about the incident, Manju Bharat Ram, the school chairperson, stated: "We have taken appropriate steps to ensure that such an incident is not repeated [...] Besides, we are taking steps like not leaving a child alone at any point in time and no male attendants would be allowed in toilets."

Charity work

In 2010, after the 2010 Leh floods, its students formed "Mission Julley", (Julley means 'hello' in the local language), an initiative that included an online community page and events, collected Rs 8 lakh for three schools and a Relief Camp in Leh.

Sujata Sahu worked here teaching IT and maths for two years before leaving to create a charity to support schools in the Ladakh region.

Notable alumni 

 Shashank Arora, Actor (Made In Heaven, Titli, Moothon)
 Varun Mitra, Actor (Guilty Minds, Jalebi)
 Saba Azad, Actor-Singer-Director (Rocket Boys, Feels Like Ishq)
 Arkodeb Mukherjee, Director of Photography (Kaagaz)
 Deeya Suzannah Bajaj, Indian adventure sports athlete
 Supriya Paul, Co-founder & CEO Josh Talks

 Vedaant Nag, Indian footballer signed by USK Maximarkt Anif, a third division Austrian club
 Pranay Manchanda, actor (Baked, Adaalat, Comedy Couple)
 Avalok langer, Executive Director ScoopWhoop
 Karan Chandhiok, Partner and Head of Competition Law (Chandhiok & Mahajan)
 Gautam Raj Anand, Founder, Hubhopper

References

External links
 The Shri Ram School Official Website (http://tsrs.org/)

International Baccalaureate schools in India
Private schools in Delhi
Schools in Gurgaon
Schools in Noida
Educational institutions established in 1988
1988 establishments in Delhi